Menelek or Menelik may refer to:

Menelik I, first Emperor of Ethiopia
Menelik II (1844–1913), Emperor of Ethiopia
Menelek XIV, fictional Emperor of Abyssinia in the novel Beyond Thirty by Edgar Rice Burroughs
Ménélik (born 1970), French singer
Menelik Watson (born 1988), British player of American football